Foreword is the debut release of the Finnish progressive metal band Crimson Lotus.
The album's worldwide release date was January 31, 2004. The album art was done by Lydia C. Burris. Guest artists on this album are Megan Branigan (vocals on track 1), Susanna Syrjä (vocals on track 2), and Landis Lee Bender II (vocals on tracks 3, 4 and 5). The album lays the foundations for a bigger concept work of two people trying to survive in two different worlds.

Track listing
"Withering of reveries" – 2:20
"Nightingale" – 4:36
"When the Heavens Fall" – 4:38
"Torn" – 6:02
"Nightingale" (Bonus) – 4:36

References

External links
 

2004 EPs
Crimson Lotus albums